The 1978 Missouri Tigers football team represented the University of Missouri during the 1978 NCAA Division I-A football season as a member of the Big Eight Conference (Big 8). The team was led by head coach Warren Powers, in his first year, and they played their home games at Faurot Field in Columbia, Missouri. They finished the season with a record of eight wins and four losses (8–4, 4–3 Big 8) and with a victory over LSU in the Liberty Bowl.

Schedule

Roster

1979 NFL Draft 

Reference:

Awards and honors 
 Warren Powers, Walter Camp Coach of the Year

References

Missouri
Missouri Tigers football seasons
Liberty Bowl champion seasons
Missouri Tigers football